Patrick Seymour is an American politician from Vermont who most recently served in the Vermont House of Representatives from Caledonia district 4 alongside Martha Feltus. He was first elected to the legislature in 2018, becoming the youngest member of the chamber, after previously running in 2016 as the Democratic nominee.

Seymour positions himself as a classically liberal Republican as was common in New England in the 19th and 20th centuries, similar to such Vermont figures as George Aiken, Winston L. Prouty, and Jim Jeffords. He aligns with policies of both libertarians such as Ron Paul and progressives such as Bernie Sanders. Seymour did not support Republican Donald Trump in the 2016 nor 2020 elections.

Seymour was first elected as a County Justice of the Peace from the town of Sutton in 2016. He serves as a member of the Caledonia County Republican Committee, the Sutton volunteer fire department, and formerly on the Sutton school board. Seymour is also a dairy farmer in the town of Sutton.

Seymour left the Democratic Party in 2016 and became Independent; later when running for the Vermont House in 2018, retiring Republican incumbent Richard Lawrence endorsed Seymour, who ended up running in the Republican primary.

Seymour won re-election as both State Representative and County Justice in the 2020 Vermont elections.

Seymour resigned from the Vermont House of Representatives on February 24, 2022, citing work and family changes as his reason for resignation.

References

External links 
 Representative Patrick Seymour
 Candidate Profile at Ballotpedia

Republican Party members of the Vermont House of Representatives
Living people
People from St. Johnsbury, Vermont
21st-century American politicians
1997 births